Von Krahl Theatre is a theatre in Tallinn, Estonia. The theatre director is Peeter Jalakas.

The theatre is established in 1992 by Peeter Jalakas and his theatrical group "Ruto Killakund".

The theatre's hall has about 100 seats.

References

External links
 

Theatres in Tallinn